Teniente Pablo Muñoz de la Morena y Martínez-Zarco (7 July 1769 – 9 September 1848) was a Spanish cavalry officer during the Napoleonic Wars, considered a Hero of the Peninsular War, who served also with distinction in the Spanish-French (1793-1795) and Spanish-Portugal (1801) wars. King Fernando VII decorated him in the battle of Mengíbar (1808)

Early life 
He was born in El Toboso, the village of Dulcinea in Cervantes's Don Quixote, within a noble family living there since the XV century, owners of 8,692 hectares.  He was the descendant of major Bartolomé Martínez de la Morena, crossbowmen of Emperor Carlos I, Dr Esteban Martínez-Zarco y Muñoz de Horcajada, rector del Collegio di Spagna (1555-1561) and Bachelor Diego Ortiz-Vivanco de la Plaza y Martínez de la Morena, member of the Order of Santiago. In 1801 he married his cousin Juana-María Cano Coronado and later, in 1826, he married Basilisa Fernández Carrasco, both with Royal permission. Between 1820 and 1823 he was appointed trustee of the City Council of El Toboso and local Commander of Arms. He died in Alcañices in 1848, where he had gone to spend a season with his youngest son, being buried in the parish cemetery.

Military career 

He entered the Army in 1785, being assigned to the regiment of provincial militias of Alcázar de San Juan, being a contemporary of José de San Martín, since he was born nine years before and died two years before, fought exactly in the same three wars.

Between 1793 and 1794 he participated in the War of the Pyrenees, fighting in the battles of Commanderie_du_Mas_Deu, Trouillas, Elne, Laroque-des-Albères and Opoul-Périllos; the taking of the castles of Banyuls-dels-Aspres, Prats-de-Mollo-la-Preste and Thuir; and the site of the castles of Collioure and Miles. He stood out in the battle against the French cavalry in the Champ de la Trompette and Saint-Génis-des-Fontaines. At the same time, he voluntarily headed the command that took the battery of Villelongue-dels-Monts, facilitating the fall of the castle of Montesquieu-des-Albères.

In 1794 he participated in the battle of the Paso de las Dos Hermanas, in Navarre.

In 1801, in the War of the Oranges, he actively participated in the taking of Juromenha and the site of Campo Maior.

In the Peninsular War, his first action was the siege, capture and surrender of the French squad in Trocadero. Later he took an active part in the battles of Jaén and Mengíbar, as well as Andújar, Bailén, Somosierra, Valdepeñas Ocaña, Montizón and Sagunto. He broke the Valencia site twice.

He obtained his retirement by Royal Office of 1812.

Further reading 

 Real Academia de la Historia: Diccionario biográfico español, entry 'Pablo Muñoz de la Morena y Martínez-Zarco'.
 Parish Archive of El Toboso: Baptism and marriage acts of Pablo Muñoz de la Morena.
 Diocesan Archive of Cuenca: Marriage File of Pablo Muñoz de la Morena and Juana-María Cano.
 General Military Archive of Segovia: Service Sheet of Pablo Muñoz de la Morena.
 Arcón Domínguez, José Luis: Sagunto. La batalla por Valencia (II). Historia de la defensa de Valencia en 1811. Simtac, Valencia, 2004.
 Parish Archive of El Alcañices: Death act of Pablo Muñoz de la Morena.

External links 

 Real Academia de la Historia
 El olvidado héroe alistano Pablo Muñoz
 Homenaje al teniente Pablo Muñoz de la Morena
 Pablo Muñoz, héroe de la Independencia
 Alma de los Dragones de Lusitania
 Cincuentenario de la Muerte de Azorín
 Cien Hidalgos clave en la Historia de España

1769 births
1848 deaths
Spanish commanders of the Napoleonic Wars